The sixth and final season of The Rockford Files originally aired Fridays at 9:00-10:00 pm on NBC from September 28 to December 14, 1979. The final episode originally aired Thursday, January 10, 1980. Garner returned to the character in eight television movies broadcast by CBS from 1994 to 1999.

Episodes

1979 American television seasons
1980 American television seasons
The Rockford Files seasons